Catherine Ellis (or variants) may refer to:

Catherine Ellis (ethnomusicologist), Australian academic
Katherine Ellis, English dance music vocalist and songwriter
Kate Ellis (politician), Australian politician
Catherine Ellis, presenter of The Bounce (TV series)
Katherine Ellis, American actress in Motocrossed

See also
Kathy Ellis, swimmer
Catherine Township, Ellis County, Kansas